Karllangia pulchra is a species of marine copepod.

References

Harpacticoida
Crustaceans described in 1994